Sport Ghiaccio Pontebba is represented by Aquile Friuli-Venezia Giulia, the Pontebba region's flagship ice hockey team, plays its home games at the PalaVuerich arena in Pontebba, Italy and is affiliated with the local ice sports society Sport Ghiaccio Pontebba. The team is a member of the Serie A and won the 2008 Italian Cup.

Pontebba
Sport in Friuli-Venezia Giulia
2014 disestablishments in Italy
1986 establishments in Italy
Ice hockey clubs established in 1986
Ice hockey clubs disestablished in 2014
Province of Udine